Severe Tropical Cyclone Eric was one of two tropical cyclones to affect the island nations of Vanuatu and Fiji within a week during January 1985. The precursor shallow depression developed within the monsoon trough during 13 January, to the west of Espiritu Santo, Vanuatu. On 16 January, the storm developed-hurricane-force winds and Eric began to undergo rapid deepening. While two different agencies differ on when and how strong Eric was at its peak, it was believed to have peak on 17 January while passing through the Fiji island group. Shortly after its peak, Eric began to weaken steadily, and by 20 January, Severe Tropical Cyclone Eric had ceased to exist as a tropical cyclone. Combined with another storm – Cyclone Nigel – Eric caused 25 fatalities and $40 million (1985 USD) worth of damage. A total of 299 farms were affected as well as the airport in Nadi. About 30,000 people were left homeless. Severe crop damage was also reported. Viti Levu sustained the worst effects from Cyclone Eric. During the aftermath of the storm, a number of first world countries distributed aid for victims of Eric.



Meteorological history

Over the next day as the system moved eastwards it developed further, with satellite imagery showing an increase in the "cyclonic curvature" of the "convective cloud". As a result, early on January 14, the Joint Typhoon Warning Centre (JTWC) reported that the systems chances of becoming a tropical cyclone were good. During that day the system rapidly developed further and became better defined with gale-force winds developing near the centre, with the JTWC initiating advisories on the system and designated it as Tropical Cyclone 11P at 12:00 UTC (00:00 FST). Four hours later as the system moved closer to Espiritu Santo, the FMS named the system Eric as it had become equivalent to a category 1 tropical cyclone on the modern day Australian tropical cyclone intensity scale. Eric subsequently passed near or over Espiritu Santo during January 15, before it turned and accelerated south-eastwards. Eric subsequently became equivalent to a category 3 severe tropical cyclone early the next day, before an Air Pacific flight from Fiji to the Solomon Islands located the systems eye on radar. The eye subsequently appeared on satellite imagery later that day, before it came into the range of Nadi airports surveillance radar at around 00:30 UTC (12:30 FST) on January 17. The FMS were subsequently able to perform fixes on the systems eye until around 07:00 UTC (19:00 FST), when the radars antenna had to be taken down and locked away as the wind speeds at Nadi increased.

Ahead of the system making landfall the FMS estimated that the system had peaked with 10-minute sustained wind-speeds of 150 km/h (90 mph). After the system had made landfall the JTWC estimated that Eric had peaked with 1-minute sustained wind speeds of 185 km/h (115 mph), which made it equivalent to a category 3 hurricane on the Saffir-Simpson hurricane wind scale. At around 10:45 UTC (22:45 FST) after the winds at Nadi had decreased the FMS were able to bring the radar back into operation and noted that Eric's eye region had been modified by the landmass of Viti-Levu. The system subsequently passed near or over Fiji's capital: Suva, before it emerged into the Koro Sea and weakened below hurricane force. The system subsequently exited the Fijian Islands shortly afterwards and was heading towards the Tongan Haʻapai Group of islands. Early on January 18, Eric passed through the Ha'apai islands just to the south of Nomuka.

Impact

Fiji
Eric was the first of two severe tropical cyclones to make landfall, on the Fijian Island of Viti Levu within 36 hours and was also the first of four tropical cyclones to impact Fiji during 1985. Ahead of Eric making landfall on the Fijian Islands during January 17, the FMS issued alerts and warnings for various parts of the country including Viti Levu and the Yasawa and Mamanuca island groups.

Offices in Suva were closed around during the afternoon hours of January 17 local time, enabling time to let the workers prepare their houses and businesses. All ships moved out of the port of Suva and took shelter elsewhere. In addition, the Nadi airport was closed and flights were diverted away from Fiji. Residents took shelter wherever they could to survive the storm.

Affecting a densely populated part of the island group, Eric brought $40 million (USD) in damage and took 25 lives. Extensive wind damage was reported; crop damage from Eric was also severe. Over  of rainfall fell in some places, resulting in extensive flooding. The combined systems destroyed 9,500 homes; many schools, shops and, hotels had to be rebuilt because of the storm. Many recreational facilities as well as may commercial builds were also party or completely destroyed by the cyclone. About 30,000 persons were reported as homeless. A total of 299 farms were affecting by the storm, resulting in nearly $2 million in damage; however damage to the pine plantations was minor.

Across Viti Levu, serious damage was reported. The Nadi airport was closed during the storm; four days after the passage of Eric, the airport re-opened for night operations. Damage from the airport alone totaled $1 million. The west part of Viti Levu as well as some other surrounding islands sustained the worst damage, though interior areas of Viti Levu suffered from severe crop damage.

Other islands
Cyclone Eric was the first of three tropical cyclones to affect Vanuatu within a week, however, there was no significant damage reported after Cyclone Eric passed through the northern islands of Vanuatu. Heavy rain associated with the system helped ease a drought in the island nation, while all 3 cyclones disrupted inter-island transport. Within Tonga there was no casualties or major damage reported, however, around 80% of the banana crop was damaged while several homes and a wharf were destroyed.

Aftermath
During the initial aftermath of Cyclone Eric the Fijian Government's Emergency Services Committee met regularly to coordinate relief efforts, with aerial and ground surveys of the cyclone damaged areas starting during January 18. Ships were also dispatched to the outer islands, in order to deliver relief supplies and assess the damage. However, the completion of these surveys had to be postponed, as Severe Tropical Cyclone Nigel made landfall on Fiji. Throughout the region relief centers were set up to accommodate the homeless, before they were closed towards the end of January with victims given various shelter materials and food supplies.

During January 22, the Fijian Government outlined their long-term rehabilitation needs and requested international assistance from the United Nations Disaster Relief Organization and other countries. These needs included a 6-month food-rationing project for 10,000 households, a rehabilitation program for 10,000 shelters and improved internal communication including between the FMS in Nadi and the capital city Suva. Administration of the relief and rehabilitation program was transferred from the Emergency Services Committee to the Prime Minister's Relief and Rehabilitation Committee on January 31.

See also

Cyclone Evan
Cyclone Kina

References

External links

Track map of Cyclone Eric from the Vanuatu Meteorological Service

Tropical cyclones in Fiji
Category 3 South Pacific cyclones
Tropical cyclones in Vanuatu
Tropical cyclones in Tonga
Retired South Pacific cyclones
1984–85 South Pacific cyclone season
Eric